Garuda Indonesia is the flag carrier of Indonesia, headquartered at Soekarno–Hatta International Airport. A successor of KLM Interinsulair Bedrijf, it is a member of SkyTeam and the second-largest airline of Indonesia after Lion Air, operating scheduled flights to a number of destinations across Asia, Europe, and Australia from its hubs, focus cities, as well as other cities for Hajj. It is the only Indonesian airline that flies to the European airspace.

At its peak from the late 1980s to the mid-1990s, Garuda operated an extensive network of flights all over the world, with regularly scheduled services to Adelaide, Cairo, Fukuoka, Johannesburg, Los Angeles, Paris, Rome and other cities in Europe, Australia and Asia. In the late 1990s and early 2000s, a series of financial and operational difficulties hit the airline hard, causing it to drastically cut back services. In 2009, the airline undertook a five-year modernization plan known as the Quantum Leap, which overhauled the airline's brand, livery, logo and uniforms, as well as newer, more modern fleet and facilities and a renewed focus on international markets, and earning the airline awards such as Most Improved Airline, 5-Star Airline, and World's Best Cabin Crew by Skytrax.

The airline also operated a budget subsidiary, Citilink, which provided low-cost flights to multiple Indonesian destinations and was spun-off in 2012. In November 2018, the airline took over operations as well as financial management of Sriwijaya Air by a cooperation agreement (KSO). This partnership expired in December 2019.

History

Beginnings (1949–60s)

The earliest predecessor to Garuda Indonesia was KNILM, Royal Dutch Indies Airways, founded in 1928 during the Dutch colonial period; despite the similar name, it was not a subsidiary of the main Dutch carrier KLM. KNILM was dissolved in 1947, and its assets were transferred to a new KLM subsidiary, KLM Interinsulair Bedrijf (KLM Interinsular Service), which was nationalized in December 1949.

In its current institutional form, Garuda Indonesia had its beginnings in the Indonesian war of independence against the Dutch in the late 1940s, when Garuda flew special transports with a Douglas DC-3. The first aircraft was a DC-3 known as Seulawah (Acehnese: "Gold Mountain", or from Arabic Shalawah, means praise/worship) and was purchased for a sum of 120,000 Malayan dollars, which was provided by the people of Aceh (notably local merchants). The first commercial flight from Calcutta to Rangoon was made on 26 January 1949, using a DC-3 Dakota aircraft with the tail number of "RI 001" and the name "Indonesian Airways". 26 January 1949 is generally recognized as the airline's founding date.

The name Garuda is taken from the Hindu tradition, which is the name of Lord Vishnu's mount (vahana) and was introduced in 1949. During the Dutch–Indonesian Round Table Conference at The Hague, from 23 August to 2 November 1949, Indonesian President Sukarno cited a Dutch poem written by a renowned Javanese scholar and poet Raden Mas Noto Soeroto: "Ik ben Garuda, Vishnoe's vogel, die zijn vleugels uitslaat hoog boven uw eilanden", which means "I'm Garuda, Vishnu's Bird, that spreads its wings high above the Islands". The first flight under the name of "Garuda Indonesian Airways" was made with a second DC-3 entering service in 1949: Its first flight, under the new name, carried Sukarno from Jakarta to Yogyakarta on 28 December.

Throughout the revolution, Garuda supported national interests and often carried diplomats on its flights. The Burmese government helped the airline significantly during its beginnings. The country's national airline, Union of Burma Airways, often chartered one of the airline's DC-3s for its own flights. Accordingly, upon Garuda's formal joint incorporation with KLM on 31 March 1950, the airline presented the Burmese government with a DC-3 as a gift.

By the early and mid-1950s, the airline operated a fleet of 38 aircraft, which included 22 DC-3s, 8 Catalina seaplanes, and 8 Convair 240s, and in 1956, the airline operated its first flight to Mecca with Convair aircraft, carrying 40 Indonesian pilgrims.

The airline's fleet continued to grow throughout the 1960s, during which time the airline continued its expansion. It acquired three Lockheed L-188 Electras in 1961, which supplemented its Convair CV-240 fleet, before taking delivery of its first jet aircraft, the Convair 990 Coronado, in 1963, which allowed it to launch flights to Hong Kong.

In 1965, the airline took delivery of its first Douglas DC-8, and grew beyond the Asian market it was focused on, beginning scheduled flights from Kemayoran Airport to Amsterdam and Frankfurt via Colombo, Bombay, and Prague. Rome and Paris became the airline's third and fourth European destinations, with flights stopping in Bombay and Cairo to refuel. Flights to the People's Republic of China began that same year, with service to Guangzhou via Phnom Penh, the first Indonesian airline to do so.

Continued growth (1970s–90s)

During the early 1970s, Garuda Indonesia took delivery of both the McDonnell Douglas DC-9 and Fokker F28 Fellowship for its short and medium-haul operations. The airline went on to take delivery of 62 F28s, holding the title for the largest operator of the F28 in the world. In 1976, the airline took delivery of its first McDonnell Douglas DC-10, giving it the capability to carry more passengers and fly longer flights, and it replaced the DC-8 and Convair 990 fleet on flights within Asia and to Europe. The DC-10 would become an integral part of the Garuda fleet for the years to come, outlasting the newer McDonnell Douglas MD-11s, before the type was finally retired in 2002. Afterwards, in 1980, the airline took delivery of the first Boeing 747-200, complementing the DC-10 on high-capacity or long-range routes.

On 21 June 1982, Garuda became the launch customer of the Airbus A300 B4-220FFCC, which was the first variant of the A300 capable of being operated with two pilots instead of three. By 1984, nine of these were in service, supplemented by 8 McDonnell Douglas DC-10s, 24 DC-9s, 45 Fokker F-28s, and 6 Boeing 747-200s. In 1985 under Reyn Altin Johannes Lumenta, who had been CEO since 1984, Garuda made the controversial decision to hire foreign brand consultants Landor Associates to create a new logo, livery and brand for the airline, a project that was regarded as expensive and unnecessary at the time. However, this move was later on applauded as vital for the reputation and corporate identity of Garuda Indonesia as the national airline.

Under Lumenta, Garuda also increased the number of flight frequencies and destinations, reduced ticket prices and collaborated with Merpati Nusantara Airlines, introducing flexible tickets valid for both Indonesian airlines.

In 1990, the airline took delivery of the McDonnell Douglas MD-11s, which gradually replaced the DC-10 on flights to Europe, and also allowed the airline to launch flights to Los Angeles via Honolulu. During this time, the airline operated a fleet of the aforementioned MD-11s, DC-10s, 747, Airbus A300 and Boeing 737-400, operating it to destinations throughout Asia, Europe and North America. In 1994, the airline took delivery of its first Boeing 747-400 aircraft, which would go on to become a mainstay of its fleet until 2015, operating hajj flights and high-density short-haul routes, while the delivery of the first Airbus A330-300 in 1996 allowed more flexibility for the airline, as it was more fuel-efficient than the three- and four-engine jets. That same year, the airline placed an order for six Boeing 777 aircraft, due for delivery in 2000, however, a new series of challenges and difficulties were about to hit the airline.

Difficult period (1996–2004)

The late 1990s and early 2000s would prove to be a turbulent and difficult time for the airline; two separate accidents in Fukuoka in 1996 and Medan in 1997 added to the problems being caused by the 1997 Asian financial crisis, resulting in a drastic reduction in operations, including the termination of service to the Americas and a massive scaling back of its European operations. Largely due to historical links with the Netherlands, Garuda continued to operate flights to Amsterdam after the initial cutbacks. The other European routes continued were Frankfurt and London. However the flights to Frankfurt and London were discontinued in 2003. While the Amsterdam route was discontinued on 28 October 2004. The situation was exacerbated by the 11 September 2001 terrorist attacks in the U.S., the Bali bombings, the 2004 Indian Ocean earthquake and tsunami, and the SARS scare, all of which contributed to a downturn in air travel and Indonesian tourism. As a result, its earlier order for the Boeing 777 was deferred, and so was an order for 18 Boeing 737-800s to replace its ageing 737 Classic fleet. However, by 2005, the airline had largely recovered from its economic problems, swapping its order for six Boeing 777-200ERs for 10 Boeing 787-8 Dreamliners in 2005, but its operational problems would remain.

Munir murder (2004–2006)
On 7 September 2004, Garuda's reputation suffered further damage when human rights activist Munir Said Thalib, traveling to Amsterdam via Singapore on Garuda Indonesia Flight 974, was assassinated by off-duty pilot Pollycarpus Priyanto, who slipped arsenic into his drink some time before the departure of the flight's second leg to Amsterdam. Munir was reported to have felt unwell several hours after departure from Singapore, during which time he was checked on by a doctor who happened to be on board, and moved to the business class cabin to sleep. He died approximately two hours before arrival into Amsterdam, sparking an international controversy, during which time Priyanto, along with CEO Indra Setiawan and deputy Rohainil Aini, were all convicted of his murder, although it has been alleged it was under orders from the Indonesian State Intelligence Agency (Badan Intelijen Negara). The airline was found negligent in failing to perform an emergency landing and was ordered to pay compensation to Munir's widow, but failed to do so.

European ban (2007–2009)
In June 2007, the EU banned Garuda Indonesia, along with all other Indonesian airlines, from flying into any European countries, following the crash of Flight 200 earlier that year. With the support of the international aviation industry for all Indonesian airlines, the EU promised to review its ban and sent a team of experts, led by the European Commission's Air Safety Administrator Federico Grandini to Indonesia to consider lifting the ban. In August 2007, the transportation minister of Indonesia announced that the EU would lift its ban hopefully sometime in October, stating that the ban was attributed to communication breakdown between the two parties and that discussions were in progress.

In November 2007, Garuda announced its intention to fly to Amsterdam from Jakarta and Denpasar with either Airbus A330 or Boeing 777 aircraft if the EU lifted its ban, however, on 28 November 2007, the EU stated that the safety reforms already undertaken were a step in the right direction for the EU to consider lifting the ban, but still did not satisfy the EU's aviation safety standards, and thus, did not lift its ban. The ban was lifted in July 2009, after which Garuda began evaluating service to Amsterdam and other European destinations, as well as the United States.

Developments after lifting of ban (2009–2020)

Following the lifting of the EU ban against Garuda Indonesia and three other Indonesian carriers, the airline announced in July 2009 an aggressive five-year expansion plan known as the Quantum Leap. The plan involved an image overhaul, including changing the airline's livery, staff uniform and logo, and nearly doubling the size of its fleet from 62 to 116. The Quantum Leap also plans to boost annual passenger numbers to 27.6 million in the same period, up from 10.1 million at the time of program launch through increasing domestic and international destinations from 41 to 62. Route expansions included Amsterdam, with a stopover in Dubai, in 2010. As of 2014, Garuda flies to Amsterdam non-stop five times a week using a Boeing 777-300ER with continuing service to London, with the sixth weekly service to be added by the end of 2015. Other European and American cities such as Frankfurt, Paris, Rome, Madrid and Los Angeles are being considered for reopening.

As part of the Quantum Leap, the airline refreshed its logo and redesigned its livery in 2009, more than 20 years after the last update. New uniforms were introduced in 2010. In 2010, the airline placed a firm order for six additional Airbus A330s at the 2010 Farnborough Airshow, while it opened a new hub at Sultan Hasanuddin International Airport, Makassar, South Sulawesi to increase services to the eastern part of Indonesia on 1 June 2011, its third after Jakarta and Denpasar.
In 2013, Garuda's won the Skytrax World's Best Cabin Crew Awards, and in 2018, Garuda's won the awards again for the fifth consecutive year.
During this period, the airline also added additional frequencies to many of its international routes, including to Singapore, Bangkok, Beijing and Shanghai from Jakarta, while it also added capacity to Denpasar-Seoul.

At the Paris Air Show 2011, Garuda Indonesia announced a firm order of 25 Airbus A320s with an option for another 25. All 25 Airbus A320s are to be used by their subsidiary, Citilink The airline's earlier order for the Boeing 787, made in 2005, was changed once more, due to the delays in the 787's entry into service. Garuda opted to sign for 10 Boeing 777-300ERs instead, which it would take delivery of in 2013 to use on long-haul flights to Europe, and medium-haul flights within Asia, such as to Japan, China, Singapore and Saudi Arabia, as well as short-haul domestic routes between Jakarta and Denpasar.

The airline made its debut on the Indonesia Stock Exchange in February 2011, with the government of Indonesia retaining a majority of the shares. PT Trans Airways bought 10.9% stake of Garuda Indonesia unsold IPO shares from underwriters on 27 April 2012. The transaction was valued at Rp 1.53 trillion ($166.8 million).
In late 2014, the airline became one of seven airlines to earn the prestigious 5-star rating from Skytrax, marking the end of the 5-year Quantum Leap program. Following this announcement, Emirsyah Satar, who had been CEO for the past nine years, announced his resignation and retirement and promoted former Citilink chief Arif Wibowo as his successor.

Following Wibowo's promotion, he began a "Quick Wins" cost-cutting drive to cut down on losses while boosting revenue through various measures, including cancelling unprofitable routes and increasing staff efficiency. Despite this, Wibowo remained committed to continuing the airline's international expansion, particularly once market conditions, such as the weakening rupiah, improved. This was reaffirmed following the airline's announcement of its intent to order 90 new aircraft, from both Boeing and Airbus, worth $20 billion at list prices at the 2015 Paris Air Show. Wibowo retired from his position in 2017, replaced by Pahala Nugraha Mansury the same year before being replaced by I Gusti Ngurah Askhara Danadiputra, otherwise known as Ari Askhara in 2018.

During Ari Askhara's leadership, Garuda introduces live acoustic concerts on domestic flights, which lead to criticism. as well as reopening the London route from Denpasar, with transit in Medan's Kualanamu International Airport. It also hit with three high-profile scandals.

In April 2019, Chairal Tanjung and Donny Oskaria, Independent Commissioners of the airline called out that Garuda's 2018 Annual Report is not in accordance with the Statement of Financial Accounting Standards, thus decided not to sign the report. Both Ministry of Finance and Financial Services Authority found various violations inside the report as both Independent Commissioners told the public, which lead to both regulators impose a penalty to the airline and auditors involved.

On 13 July 2019, travel reviewer and YouTuber Rius Vernandes shared a picture of a hand-written menu during his flight from Sydney to Jakarta, which leads to Garuda's management reporting the YouTuber to the police followed by the airline issuing a regulation prohibiting selfies on the plane and a lawsuit prompted by Garuda's workers' association also known as SEKARGA. Both Garuda's and SEKARGA's action were panned and criticized by worldwide netizens. Through mediation, Rius and Garuda buried the hatchet, and SEKARGA pulled the lawsuit on 19 July 2019.

Controversy during the leadership of Ari Askhara 
On 5 December 2019, Ari Askhara was fired from his position for smuggling a classic Harley-Davidson motorcycle and Brompton folded bicycle. The motorcycle and bicycle were found by the Soekarno–Hatta International Airport's Customs and Excise team inside a recently-delivered Airbus A330-900 aircraft. It was revealed that Ari Askhara and other directors had been implementing various policies that harmed Garuda flight attendants, such as mutation without explanation, additional flight hours, and discrimination between employees. These policies have since been revoked.

A year later in December 2020, it was revealed through Twitter that many Garuda flight attendants had been victims of sexual harassment and coercion to prostitution during Ari's leadership, with many attendants confirming that VP Cabin Attendant Roni Eka Mirsa was the pimp for the prostitution circle. Police responded by investigating the whistleblower in the case for defamation after a report was filed by an air hostess who was allegedly the mistress of various executives at state-owned enterprises. She later dropped the defamation complaint. State-owned Enterprises Minister Erick Thohir said that he would consider dismissing executives of state-owned enterprises if their female employees have faced sexual harassment.

COVID-19 pandemic (2020–present) 

On 14 May 2020, as a result of the COVID-19 pandemic and its impacts on aviation and airlines, Garuda Indonesia furloughed 800 of its staff for at least three months. In June, it laid off 180 contracted pilots. The airline implemented face masks for the crew members in accordance with health regulations to prevent the spread of the disease. On 16 June 2020, after some passengers complained that they could not see the flight attendants' faces, Garuda president director Irfan Setiaputra said the airline was planning to replace face masks with face shields for its cabin crew. Three days later, in response to public criticism over the plan, he said Garuda's flight attendants would not stop using face masks.

Financial trouble 
Due to the prolonged pandemic situation, Garuda Indonesia experienced problems in operations, management, and funding. Its debt became arisen and unpaid, and the corporation is currently on the verge of bankruptcy in court, and future closure by the government. In the effort to save the airline, Garuda has cut around 30 percent of its workforce, reducing its staff to 5,400 staffs from 7,861 staff. Garuda claimed that its board of directors and its commissioners have taken a pay cut as well.

At the end of 2021, Garuda reported a debt of $9.8 billion to more than 800 creditors, complicating efforts for out-of-court settlement attempts during the COVID-19 pandemic, where Garuda's income dropped by 70 percent. As the future replacement of Garuda Indonesia in case the corporation is deemed beyond saving, the government prepared Pelita Air Service, a cargo airline currently owned by Pertamina, to be the successor of Garuda Indonesia as the new flag carrier of Indonesia.

In May 2022, Garuda is scheduled to appear in the court for its attempts to reschedule its debts. Garuda filed for a 30-day delay in the proceedings, which is granted by the court. This is a second extension given by the court, as the original court date is in March 2022.

In April 2022, the Sixth Committee of Indonesia's People Representative Council and Erick Thohir, Indonesia's Minister of State Owned Enterprises, decided to execute a scheme to save the ailing airline.

In June 2022, during Garuda's attempt to delay payment of its debts, Garuda announced that its debt is $8.3 billion, where its biggest debtors is Airbus SE and Pertamina. If the delay to pay its debts is accepted by its creditors, Garuda promised that it will be profitable in 3 years. Garuda will also seek funding of $1.3 billion through global bonds and issuance of new stocks. On 17 June 2022, Garuda's creditors voted to accept Garuda's debt restructuring, saving the company from bankruptcy. Boeing is not joining the debt restructuring process because Garuda stated that its amount of debt to Boeing is not verified yet, and Garuda stated that if Boeing did not confirm its debt to Boeing in 30 days after the debt restructuring, Garuda's debt to Boeing can be totally removed. On 20 June 2022, Garuda's debt restructuring is put on hold because two of the lessors did not agree with the debt restructuring, and a new court date is set on 27 June 2022.

In September 2022, Garuda Indonesia filed for US Chapter 15 bankruptcy protection.

Corruption case 
On 22 June 2022, Attorney General's Office of Indonesia stated that it is finishing its investigation of corruption on the purchase of CRJ-1000 and ATR72-600 aircraft which is breaking the law. Setijo Awibowo, the Vice President of Strategic Management, Agus Wahjudo, the Executive Project Manager of Aircraft Delivery and ex-Vice President of Treasury Management Albert Burhan is the suspect in the case. Emirsyah Satar, the CEO during the alleged corruption, has been arrested for another corruption case. The loss for Indonesia is reported to be US$609 million.

Corporate affairs and identity

Presidents and CEOs

Branding and livery

Since its establishment, Garuda Indonesia has changed its branding and livery multiple times.

Original livery and logo 
During the airline's early years, Garuda's colour scheme was a simple "Indonesia Airways" logotype with blue lines running along the fuselage and the Indonesian flag on the horizontal stabiliser.

1960s rebranding 
In the 1960s, Garuda introduced a red and white colour scheme in accordance with the Indonesian national identity and the Indonesian flag. Also, during this period, the airline introduced a bird logo: a triangle stylized eagle-like Garuda with a red and white shield. The logo was painted on the vertical stabiliser of Garuda's aircraft from 1961 to 1969.

1970s rebranding 
In the 1970s, a logotype with a unique font replaced the triangular eagle as Garuda's corporate identity, along with a new colour scheme consisting of a red and orange "hockey stick" line running along the aircraft's windows and vertical stabiliser. This livery was used from 1969 to 1985.

1985 rebranding 
In 1985, Garuda underwent a complete branding makeover, changing its name into "Garuda Indonesia" along with its livery, logo and logotype. The new branding and livery were created by Landor Associates who also created the new logo: the Garuda symbol with five bent lines forming its wings. The colour scheme was changed to a deep royal blue and aqua color, said to be inspired by the nature of Indonesia that was dominated by tropical greenery and seas when viewed from the air. The nationalistic red and white colour scheme was no longer used.

2009 rebranding 
In 2009, a new branding initiative was launched through a new image, developed once again by brand consultant Landor Associates: a new spin of the idea called "nature's wing". Garuda has since replaced the old logo painted on its aircraft's vertical stabilisers with this new "nature's wing" graphic of blue and aqua shades. The "nature's wing" graphic was inspired by the wings of tropical birds as well as the ripples of waves upon the water. The bird symbol designed by Landor 24 years earlier is still maintained as Garuda Indonesia's logo, with minor changes, while the logotype now uses a font similar to Myriad Pro.

Special liveries 
To celebrate its 62 years of service, on 26 January 2011, Garuda Indonesia painted 2 of its Boeing 737-800s with retro liveries the airline used in the 1960s and 1970s.

To raise awareness on wearing masks during the COVID-19 pandemic, Garuda Indonesia painted five of their aircraft with a surgical mask tied to its nose, with the words "Ayo pakai masker," meaning "Please wear masks," introduced on 1 October 2020. This is part of Indonesia's governmental responses to the pandemic, however the design itself is from an ongoing competition Garuda launched called Fly Your Design Through The Sky, asking people to design masks to be painted in one of their planes.

Head office
Garuda Indonesia has its head office at Soekarno–Hatta International Airport in Tangerang, Banten, Indonesia, near Cengkareng and near Jakarta. The head office is the Garuda Indonesia Management Building, located within the Garuda Indonesia City Center. The about  head office facility is on a  plot of land. As of 2009, the head office houses the Garuda management and about 1,000 employees from various units. Indonesian President Susilo Bambang Yudhoyono opened the current Garuda head office in 2009. The previous head office was located in the city center of Jakarta, in Central Jakarta.

Privatization
Garuda Indonesia had announced that its subsidiary GMF AeroAsia would be listed in Indonesia Stock Exchange in 2008. However, due to the financial crisis of 2008, GMF delayed IPO until 2009. The Ministry of State-Owned Companies (Kementrian BUMN) had also announced a plan to privatize Garuda, that opened a possibility to offer its shares publicly.
Garuda Indonesia aimed to list on 11 February 2011, for an initial public offering. Government of Indonesia has confirmed the IPO price of Garuda Indonesia at Rp.750 per share and also cut offering size to 6.3 billion shares only from 9.362 billion planned before.

Subsidiaries
Garuda Indonesia's subsidiaries include:

In September 2019, Garuda Indonesia launched the grandchildren of the company, PT Garuda Tauberes Indonesia application. The company is engaged in logistics orders, both for couriers, air cargo gateways and payments through the e-commerce application platform Tauberes. The concept carried is smart logistic services. In addition, four new grandchildren of the company have also been established. The four companies are PT Garuda Daya Pratama Sejahtera, PT Garuda Indonesia Air Charter. Then followed, PT Garuda Ilmu Terapan Cakrawala, and PT Garuda Energi Logistik dan Komersial.

Cooperation

On 18 August 2018, Garuda Indonesia signed an MoU agreement with the cargo airline Jayawijaya Dirgantara relating to the distribution of cargo from Jayapura to Wamena.

Destinations

Garuda Indonesia operates flights to 96 airport destinations (72 domestic and 24 international) in 12 countries (including Indonesia), with approximately 500 daily departures from its hubs at Jakarta, Denpasar, Makassar and  Medan The airline serves 3 continents Asia, Australia and Europe with its fleet of 140 aircraft, to destinations such as Singapore,
Shanghai–Pudong, Tokyo–Haneda, Tokyo–Narita, Amsterdam, Melbourne, Sydney, Guangzhou, Beijing–Capital, Bangkok–Suvarnabhumi, Seoul–Incheon, Jeddah, Medina, Hong Kong, Kuala Lumpur–International, and although it has rapidly expanded its route network since the Quantum Leap began in 2009, the airline still does not fly to several major cities, such as Manila and Ho Chi Minh City, and despite the airline repeatedly stating its intention to fly to Manila, a time frame has not been given.

On 13 October 2009, the airline announced it would resume flights to Europe for the first time following its removal from the E.U. blacklist. It commenced flights between Jakarta and Amsterdam in June 2010, initially with a refueling stop in Dubai. On 2 December 2012, after agreeing to a codeshare agreement with Etihad Airways, the airline changed the refueling stop to Abu Dhabi. After the delivery of its Boeing 777-300ER aircraft in 2013, the airline removed the Abu Dhabi refueling stop, and commenced non-stop service to Amsterdam, as the longest flight operated by the airline, and consequently ending flights to Abu Dhabi, leaving Etihad as the sole operator between Jakarta and Abu Dhabi. On 8 September that year, the airline extended its Amsterdam flight with continuing service to London Gatwick.

In 2011, Garuda flew 17.1 million passengers up 39% from the previous year, while the total revenue jumped 38% to Rp27.1 trillion ($2.95 billion). Composition of passengers on domestic routes and international routes was 81% versus 19% respectively.

On 31 March 2016, Garuda Indonesia inaugurated its first flight from Singapore Changi Airport to London Heathrow, using a Boeing 777-300ER.

In mid 2016, Garuda announced its intention to resume service to Mumbai from Jakarta. This service is opened on 12 December 2016 via Bangkok using Boeing 737-800 NG.

On 12 September 2016, Garuda Indonesia announced its intention to resume service to Los Angeles via Tokyo-Narita using a Boeing 777-300ER from Jakarta after the Federal Aviation Administration (FAA) granted a Category 1 rating to Indonesia. This is slated to start in November 2017. The last time Los Angeles was served was in 1998. As of 2019, however, the plan is yet to be realized and has most likely been shelved as the Government of Japan has yet to approve fifth freedom rights to Garuda.

In February 2017, Garuda Indonesia announced that the airline will resume flights to Dubai and Moscow using the wide-body Airbus A330-200. This flight is planned to be resumed in 2018, although as of 2019 has not been realized.

In August 2018, Garuda Indonesia announced that the airline will end flights to London Heathrow by October, although it then resumed flights on December with a dual-class Boeing 777-300ER on the same year. 2019 marked further adjustments to Garuda's flight to London Heathrow as the airline announced a Jakarta-London Heathrow, London Heathrow-Denpasar routing.

Codeshare agreements and alliances

Codesharing has allowed Garuda Indonesia to expand services into Western Europe and the Middle East. In 2009, Garuda Indonesia expressed an interest in joining the SkyTeam airline alliance, which would make it the second airline in Southeast Asia to join after Vietnam Airlines. Membership would open SkyTeam's network to Indonesian, Australian, and New Zealand markets, which it lacked connectivity to. In December 2009, three SkyTeam members – Korean Air, KLM, and Delta Air Lines (China Airlines joined as fourth member to support Garuda after its 2011 SkyTeam inclusion) – committed to supporting Garuda Indonesia to join SkyTeam. This made Garuda Indonesia eligible to apply for membership in the alliance. On 23 November 2010, Garuda Indonesia signed an agreement to join SkyTeam. However instead of the usual 18–24 months to complete membership formalities, shortcomings with its IT system delayed Garuda's entry. After a 40-month process, the airline eventually became the 20th member of the alliance on 5 March 2014, some two years after the original target date.

 On 19 June 2007, Garuda Indonesia and Hainan Airlines began codesharing in a bid to strengthen both airlines' marketing positions in Indonesia and People's Republic of China. In this agreement, Garuda Indonesia will be the operating partner on the Jakarta-Beijing (vv) service, flying five times a week using a new A330-200.
 An interline agreement between Garuda Indonesia and Australian airline Virgin Blue was confirmed in November 2007. This facilitates travel for passengers connecting from a Virgin Australia domestic flight to a Garuda Indonesia international service departing from either Sydney, Melbourne or Perth.
 In June 2008, it was announced that Garuda Indonesia would increase services between Australia and Bali. From 25 June, Garuda Indonesia added an extra flight between Darwin and Denpasar, bringing the total number of services to three per week. Additionally, a fourth flight from Melbourne to Denpasar began on 22 July. On 2 September, another extra service departed from Melbourne to bring the total number of flights per week to five, and a sixth flight left from Sydney. This extra capacity was in response to an increase in the number of Australians who traveled to Bali in the first quarter of 2008, marking a resurgence in Balinese tourism, which was hit hard by the 2002 and 2005 Bali bombings.
 In August 2008, a codeshare agreement between Singapore Airlines and the airline on the route between Singapore and Denpasar was established. Singapore Airlines is the operating carrier.
 A partnership agreement with Etihad Airways was announced on 16 October 2012. The partnership includes a codeshare agreement for a total of 36 flights between the two airlines; subject to Government Regulatory Approval. Reciprocal Frequent Flyer programmes were also part of the agreement, allowing passengers to earn miles flying both Garuda Indonesia and Etihad Airways. Garuda Indonesia subsequently shifted its Dubai operations to Abu Dhabi as to complement the agreement.
 During the APEC summit on 7 October 2013, a codeshare agreement between Garuda Indonesia and Aeroméxico was announced, allowing passengers to travel from Jakarta to Mexico City via Tokyo and vice versa. Under the codeshare agreement, Aeromexico would place its flight numbers on Garuda Indonesia's Jakarta-Tokyo flights while Garuda Indonesia would place its flight numbers on Aeromexico's Tokyo-Mexico City flights.
 On 19 November 2013, a codeshare agreement was announced between Garuda Indonesia and Jet Airways of India. Under the codeshare agreement, Jet Airways would place its flight numbers on Garuda Indonesia flights between Jakarta and Singapore while Garuda Indonesia would place its flight numbers on Jet Airways flights between Singapore and Mumbai, Delhi and Chennai. The two airlines also announced a reciprocal Frequent Flyer programme partnership, allowing passengers to earn miles flying both Garuda Indonesia and Jet Airways.
 On 19 December 2013, Garuda Indonesia and Japan's All Nippon Airways announced a partnership agreement encompassing codeshare flights as well as reciprocal Frequent Flyer programmes. Under the codeshare agreement, ANA passengers arriving in Jakarta would be able to transfer to 10 destinations in Indonesia on board Garuda Indonesia flights, while Garuda Indonesia passengers arriving in Tokyo or Osaka would be able to transfer to 11 destinations in Japan on board ANA flights.

Garuda Indonesia has codeshare agreements with the following airlines:

 Aeroflot
 Aeroméxico
 Air Europa
 Air France
 All Nippon Airways
 Bangkok Airways
 China Airlines
 China Eastern Airlines
 China Southern Airlines
 Delta Air Lines
 Emirates
 Etihad Airways
 ITA Airways
 Japan Airlines
 Kenya Airways
 KLM
 Korean Air
 Malaysia Airlines
 Myanmar Airways International
 Oman Air
 Philippine Airlines
 Saudia
 Singapore Airlines
 Turkish Airlines
 Vietnam Airlines
 XiamenAir

Explore and Explore-jet sub-brands

As Indonesia's flag carrier, Garuda Indonesia tries to connect many parts of Indonesia to support the government's "Indonesian Interconnectivity" program. However, many remote and smaller airports cannot be reached by Garuda Indonesia's fleet of Boeing 737-800s. This is caused by the lack of airport infrastructure in smaller cities and remote areas, such as insufficient runway length that mostly less than 1,600 meters.

In line with its Quantum Leap plan, Garuda Indonesia ordered brand-new Bombardier CRJ1000 and ATR 72 to reach smaller airports from Garuda's hubs like Ngurah Rai International Airport, Sultan Hasanuddin International Airport, and Kualanamu International Airport. On 25 November 2013, Garuda Indonesia has launched its new sub-brands "Explore" and "Explore-jet", for servicing perintis ("pioneer") lines traditionally served by other airlines — (dormant) Merpati Nusantara Airlines and also its competitor Wings Air.

In 2022, due to the corruption scandal surrounding Bombardier CRJ1000 and ATR 72 fleet procurement back in 2013, and the company's worsened financial condition during the Covid-19 pandemic has forced the grounding of these two types of aircraft fleets. Currently, most of the fleets has been returned to the lessor or transferred to its subsidiary Citilink, which also means the end of the "Explore" and "Explore-jet" sub-brands.

SkyTeam

On 5 March 2014, Garuda Indonesia officially joined the SkyTeam alliance and became its 20th member. The inclusion of Garuda Indonesia adds 40 new destinations to SkyTeam's global network and strengthens the alliance presence in Southeast Asia and Australia. To commemorate the event, the airline repainted an Airbus A330-300, a Boeing 737-800, and a Bombardier CRJ1000 with SkyTeam livery. In addition to repainted aircraft, a Boeing 777-300ER was delivered with SkyTeam livery. With the arrival of Garuda Indonesia to SkyTeam, a variety of facilities are given as including SkyPriority, as well as changing its current frequent flyer membership into GarudaMiles. In addition, Garuda is connected with 140 new destinations and also teamed up with the world's major airlines, such as Aeroflot, Aeroméxico, Air France, China Airlines, Delta Air Lines, KLM, Korean Air, and Saudia.

Fleet
The Boeing customer code for Garuda Indonesia is U3, which appears on its aircraft designations as an infix, such as 737-8U3 and 777-3U3ER.

The airline utilizes the Boeing 777-300ER on high-density medium and long-haul routes. The Airbus A330 fleet is primarily used on most medium-haul routes from Jakarta and Denpasar, as well as for Umrah and Hajj flights. The Boeing 737-800 and Boeing 737 MAX 8 aircraft are used on most domestic and regional routes. Meanwhile, the Bombardier CRJ1000 is used to fly to airports incapable of handling the newer 737-800, replacing the Boeing 737 Classic. The ATR 72-600 turboprop entered service at the end of 2013, serving new inter-island routes to airports in middle and eastern part of Indonesia that cannot handle jet aircraft.

At the Paris Air Show in 2015, Garuda Indonesia signed a Letter of Intent (LoI) to purchase 90 new aircraft from Boeing and Airbus (30 737 MAX, 20 787 Dreamliner, 30 A350 XWB) worth $20 billion at list prices Garuda has also signed a LoI for 14 Airbus A330-900s aircraft (including 7 cancellations from existing A330-300 order), first reported during the Singapore Airshow 2016, confirming the order on 19 April 2016.

On 5 October 2017, Garuda operated its last Boeing 747 service after the last aircraft touched down in Makassar from Medina, a returning Hajj flight. It was then ferried to Jakarta the following day for retirement.

In January 2019, CEO Ari Askhara stated that the airline was considering and negotiating with lessors for a switch of 34 out of the remaining 49 Boeing 737 MAXes on order to the larger MAX 10 variant, as the airline was planning to resume 737 MAX deliveries by 2020. In March 2019, the airline decided to cancel its outstanding orders for 49 Boeing 737 MAX aircraft, citing a loss of passenger confidence in the type after the crashes of Lion Air Flight 610 and Ethiopian Airlines Flight 302. In November 2020, the airline clarified that their order for Boeing 737 MAX is not cancelled yet, and talks are still ongoing with Boeing concerning the order.

Current fleet
, Garuda Indonesia operates the following aircraft:

Historic fleet

Special liveries

Services
Garuda Indonesia is a full-service airline featuring economy, business and first classes. The airline began to introduce new premium products and services with the arrival of the Airbus A330-200 and Boeing 737-800 aircraft. First class cabins were introduced in 2013 on board the Boeing 777-300ER with Wi-Fi and telecommunication services on board.

Cabin

First Class 
First class is available on two Boeing 777-300ER aircraft, featuring eight suites arranged in a 1-2-1 configuration. The first class seats are suites, with sliding doors for extra privacy. They feature 24" AVOD screen and seats that converts into a bed, as well as a touchscreen seat controller. There is a chef on board the aircraft to tend to the passengers' needs. First Class passengers can use in-flight Wi-Fi connectivity at no extra cost. It has a seat pitch of 82 inches and a seat width of 22 inches.

The product was originally available on all Boeing 777-300ER aircraft, however, it was decided the final four aircraft would be delivered in a two-class configuration. In 2017, four more aircraft were refitted into the two-class configuration, leaving just two aircraft featuring First Class.

Business Class 
Garuda's business class product, is available on all aircraft except the ATR 72–600 and six older A330-300.
The new Business Class cabin on-board Garuda's Boeing 777-300ERs are fitted with EADS Sogerma flat-bed seats arranged in a staggered 1-2-1 configuration; allowing for direct aisle access to all passengers. These seats feature a 74" seat pitch, 15" AVOD screen, USB ports, in-seat laptop power supply, and personal reading light.

Four new A330-300s, delivered from 2016 onwards, feature the B/E Super Diamond business class seat, featuring all-aisle access, in a staggered 1-2-1 configuration, a 180-degree recline, more storage space, a new 16-inch entertainment screen, and touchscreen seat controls, along with an all new Panasonic eX3 inflight entertainment system.

On-board other Airbus A330s, the Business Class cabin feature a fully flat-bed seats on all -200s and seven -300s (delivered between 2013 and 2015). However, there are no Business Class seats on board six older A330-300s delivered in 1997. The flatbed seats have up to 74" seat pitch. Seats are equipped with personal AVOD In-Flight Entertainment System (IFE), USB ports, in-seat laptop power supply, and personal reading light. Business Class seats on board these are configured in a 2-2-2 configuration.

Garuda's Boeing 737-800 aircraft also features a reclining Business Class product with 42" seat pitch in a 2–2 layout, equipped with an in-seat laptop power supply, personal 9-inch touch-screen & handset activated AVOD In-Flight Entertainment, and personal reading light.

A range of hot and cold beverages are available, along with snacks and/or meals, depending on the length of the flight. Wine and beers are also offered on international flights.

Economy Class 

Economy Class seats are available on all aircraft. Seat configuration is 2–2 on the ATR 72 and CRJ1000, 3-3 on the 737, 2-4-2 on the A330 as well as 3-3-3 on the 777. Seat widths range from 17 inches on board all 737, ATR 72 and CRJ1000, to over 18 inches on board the A330 and 777. Seat pitch is 30 inches on the ATR 72 and Bombardier CRJ1000 aircraft, 31–32 inches on the 737, 32–33 inches on board the 777, and 33–34 inches on board the A330.

Seat-back inflight entertainment is offered on all 737s (except PK-GEx series) and all A330s and 777s. Except for four newest A330 aircraft (which feature an 11.1-inch touchscreen), every seat has a 9-inch seat-back touchscreen.

Old cabins

ESCort (Economy Sleeping Comfort) 
ESCort (Economy Sleeping Comfort) was Garuda's one of two newest onboard class service that was introduced in 2019 exclusively on its flights to and from London-Heathrow. On ESCort class, passengers can enjoy three whole economy class seats for themselves. The airline provided a mattress, pillow, and duvet cover along with business class meals and amenities for passengers traveling in this class. Passengers were allowed to lie down on the three-seats during the flight.

Premium Economy 
Premium Economy was the second onboard class service that Garuda Indonesia introduced in 2019 as it marks its maiden flight from London Heathrow to Denpasar, Bali. The Premium Economy class gave traveling couples an extra empty seat in the regular economy class cabin. Passengers in Premium Economy can also enjoy a  checked baggage allowance along with a business class meal and amenity kit.

In-flight entertainment

In-Flight Entertainment (IFE) is available on board most Garuda Indonesia aircraft: all A330s, all 777s, and all but three 737-800s.

Garuda's Boeing 777-300ER, Airbus A330s, and newer Boeing 737-800 aircraft are equipped with Audio video on demand In-Flight Entertainment System in all classes. The Economy Class on these aircraft features a 9-inch LCD touch-screen, while the Business Class features a 9-inch, 11-inch, and 15-inch touch-screen LCD in Garuda's Boeing 737-800, older Airbus A330-200, and all remaining Airbus A330 series and 777 aircraft respectively. In Business Class on board the Airbus A330-300 and newer A330-200 aircraft, the screens are located on the seat backs or in the armrest of bulkhead rows, while in the older Airbus A330-200 aircraft and Boeing 737-800s, the screens are stowed in the armrest. In Economy Class, they are on the seat back.

Garuda introduced a new IFE system on board four A330-300 aircraft. These come with an 11-inch touchscreen in Economy with a touchpad controller, and a 16-inch touchscreen in Business with a 4.7-inch touchscreen remote. Newspapers and magazines are provided to all passengers on board all flights. 6 international television channels are available on board the Boeing 777-300ER.

Immigration On-Board (IoB)
Immigration on Board (IoB) was a special service created by Garuda Indonesia to provide more convenience for passengers traveling to Indonesia. With this service, in cooperation with the Directorate General of Immigration, an agency under Indonesian Ministry of Law and Human Rights, Garuda Indonesia passengers on certain long-haul flights could complete their immigration process on-board before landing and disembarking.

By utilizing this service, Garuda Indonesia passengers did not have to queue at the immigration counter upon arrival at Ngurah Rai International Airport in Denpasar or Soekarno–Hatta International Airport in Jakarta. The service was stopped since 2014.

Ticketing

A Jakarta-based 24-hour call center is available for local customer access where payment can be made by credit cards, internet/mobile banking or transfers via ATM. Recently online booking from their website is also possible with payment can be made online with credit cards from select countries.

In April 2011, Garuda Indonesia announced plans to develop online sales. Garuda Indonesia had cooperated with Visa and MasterCard to develop an online credit card payment system, allowing customers to use PayPal. Debit card payments may be processed with Bank Mandiri, BCA or BII.

Frequent-flyer program

Garuda Frequent Flyer, Garuda Indonesia's frequent-flyer program was launched in September 1999.
In 2005, Garuda Indonesia relaunched its Garuda Frequent Flyer (GFF) with a new look, benefits and services. The new program allows members to earn miles on domestic and international flights and has four tiers of membership covering GFF Junior, Blue, Silver, Gold, and Platinum status levels. Since June 2011 Garuda Indonesia launched a joint frequent flyer program with Korean Air. Members of the Garuda Frequent Flyer (GFF) program and Korean Air's SkyPass program will benefit from the cooperation by accruing mileage for flying both Korean Air and Garuda or any Garuda–Korean Air code share flights.

From 27 March 2014, due to joining SkyTeam, Garuda Indonesia announced that Garuda Frequent Flyer renamed as GarudaMiles. In 2017, Citilink's frequent-flyer program, Supergreen, merged with GarudaMiles, dubbed 'Supergreen GarudaMiles', before merging fully with GarudaMiles. Now, GarudaMiles served as Garuda Indonesia and Citilink's frequent-flyer program.

As of 2019, besides Garuda, Citilink, and SkyTeam members (with exception of Alitalia, as currently, Garuda can only earn miles from Alitalia flights), GarudaMiles members can earn and spend their miles with Etihad Airways and All Nippon Airways. GarudaMiles members previously able to earn and spend miles with India's Jet Airways before Jet's demise in 2019.

Lounge

Business Class lounge
The Garuda Business Lounge is open to passengers travelling in Business Class, as well as those holding a Platinum GarudaMiles card. Lounges are located at Soekarno–Hatta International Airport and throughout Indonesia, offering food and drinks, wireless internet, showers, meeting rooms and business services.

First Class lounge
Garuda Indonesia First Class Lounge is located only in Soekarno–Hatta International Airport. The lounge's facilities include reading materials, a small library, cigar room, kitchen, Prayer room (Musholla), nursery room, toilets (including ones for disabled individuals), showers, and a self-playing piano. The lounge also provides food and beverages.

Sponsorships
Garuda Indonesia was the official sponsor of the 2011 Southeast Asian Games. Garuda Indonesia also supports the "Wonderful Indonesia" tourism campaign by placing the "Wonderful Indonesia" logo in their promotional materials as well as on the hulls of their aircraft.

In July 2012, Garuda Indonesia signed a 3-year sponsorship deal with Premier League club Liverpool FC. The agreement gives Garuda Indonesia the right to be the Official Partner of Liverpool Football Club and the Official Global Airline Partner of Liverpool Football Club. In addition, a six-minute advertisement video of Garuda Indonesia will be broadcast during matches held at the Liverpool FC home ground, Anfield, for the 2012–2014 season.

This collaboration with Liverpool will give Garuda Indonesia media  exposure  to increase brand awareness in the international market more effectively with more maximal benefits, given the  brand  Garuda Indonesia will get a higher frequency of delivery with a longer broadcast duration. In 2013, Liverpool toured Asia with one of the countries the goal was Indonesia. Through the tour visit, it is expected that this visit will improve the quality of football matches in Indonesia.

To support the visit target of 20 million tourists in 2019, Garuda Indonesia will increase the number of aircraft fleets that have been installed with the 'Wonderful Indonesia' logo on their aircraft starting this year. Business Director of Garuda Indonesia, Handayani at the Tourism Ministry's End-of-Year Press Conference at Sapta Pesona Building, Ministry of Tourism Office of the Republic of Indonesia, Jakarta said, in February 2016 there will be at least five additional Garuda Indonesia aircraft that have the Wonderful Indonesia logo as a form of cooperation between Garuda Indonesia and the Ministry of Tourism. "Hopefully it can support Indonesia's tourism," said Handayani. Also, Garuda Indonesia will provide tourism support in the form of developing flight routes by strengthening flight routes that are superior in the tourism sector, such as Labuan Bajo, Lombok, and Wakatobi.

Market share

For most of modern Indonesian history, Garuda Indonesia has dominated the Indonesian air travel market share. However, started in 2000, Lion Air started to grow and become a serious rival in domestic air travel in Indonesia. By the time COVID-19 pandemic were still underway in mid-2021, Lion Air still holds the majority Indonesia's domestic air travel market share by 29.7%, while Garuda Indonesia came in fourth with 10.5% share. Citilink came in second with a market share of 22.6%, followed by Lion's full-service subsidiary Batik (8.9%). Lion Air's regional flight service Wings Air holds a 7.9% share. Indonesia AirAsia, a unit of the Malaysian budget airline, had a 1.9% market share.

Overall, Indonesian domestic air travel business is overwhelmingly ruled by two groups; Lion Air group and Garuda Indonesia group. In 2021, Lion Air group accounted for 59.4% of market share, while Garuda Indonesia group had a 33.1% market share.

For international routes, Garuda Indonesia has identified four airlines that became the benchmark to improve their service and to compete to be the world's best airline. The serious rivals for Garuda Indonesia's international routes are Singapore Airlines, Qatar Airways, Emirates and Cathay Pacific.

Incidents and accidents

See also

 Aviation in Indonesia
 List of airlines of Indonesia
 List of airports in Indonesia
 List of companies of Indonesia
 Tourism in Indonesia
 Transport in Indonesia

References

External links

  
 Official website (1996–1997)
 Garuda Annual Report 2012
 Colours Garuda Indonesia Magazine 

Companies based in Tangerang
 
Companies that filed for Chapter 11 bankruptcy in 2022
Airlines established in 1949
Airlines of Indonesia
Airlines formerly banned in the European Union
Association of Asia Pacific Airlines
Companies listed on the Indonesia Stock Exchange
Former seaplane operators
Government-owned airlines
Government-owned companies of Indonesia
Indonesian brands
Indonesian companies established in 1947
2011 initial public offerings
SkyTeam